Eupastranaia lilacina is a moth in the family Crambidae. It was described by Pagenstecher in 1892. It is found in Bolivia.

References

Moths described in 1892
Midilinae